Ipsheim is a municipality in the district of Neustadt (Aisch)-Bad Windsheim in Bavaria in Germany.

St. Michael is a chapel on a hill near Kaubenheim which is part of it.

Elia Levita, author of the Bovo-Bukh (written 1507–1508), the most popular chivalric romance written in Yiddish, was born here.

References

Neustadt (Aisch)-Bad Windsheim